The European Sign Language Centre (ESC) is a nonprofit organization, working towards greater recognition and use of sign language.

See also
 European Union of the Deaf
 World Federation of the Deaf
 Languages of the European Union

References

External links
 signlanguage.eu, official website

Deaf culture
Deafness organizations
Organizations related to the European Union